Kopomá Municipality (Yucatec Maya: "low or sunken water") is one of the 106 municipalities in the Mexican state of Yucatán containing (260.59 km2) of land and is located roughly  southwest of the city of Mérida.

History
There is no accurate data on when the town was founded, but it was a settlement before the conquest and was located in the chieftainship of Ah Canul. After colonization, the area became part of the encomienda system with various encomenderos, such as in 1638 Francisco de Castillo Alvarado, Violante de Aragón y Guzmán, and Luis Francisco de Guardiola. It passed to Angela Menéndez de Porres in 1680, in 1691 to Casimiro J. Osorio Menéndez de Avilés, and to Josi Pordio in 1734.

Yucatán declared its independence from the Spanish Crown in 1821 and in 1825 the area was assigned to the Camino Real under the  Maxcanú Municipality. In 1935 the area became its own municipality.

Governance
The municipal president is elected for a three-year term. The town council has four councilpersons, who serve as Secretary and councilors of municipal heritage and urban planning; public works and public services; ecology and public security; and highway administration.

The Municipal Council administers the business of the municipality. It is responsible for budgeting and expenditures and producing all required reports for all branches of the municipal administration. Annually it determines educational standards for schools.

The Police Commissioners ensure public order and safety. They are tasked with enforcing regulations, distributing materials and administering rulings of general compliance issued by the council.

Communities
The head of the municipality is Kopomá, Yucatán. The municipality has 3 other populated places including Concepción, San Bernardo and Santa Clara. The significant populations are shown below:

Local festivals
Every year on 15 May the town celebrates the feast of its patron, San Isidro Labrador.

Tourist attractions
 Church of Nuestra Señora de la Asunción, built in the colonial era
 Hacienda San Bernardo
 Cenote San Tito - this is a small cenote in someone's backyard with challenging vertical access and suitable for the more adventurous traveler. There is no infrastructure here at the time of this writing (2020) and the fee to descend into the refreshing waters is 30 pesos per person.

References

Municipalities of Yucatán